Kaufman oculocerebrofacial syndrome is an autosomal recessive congenital disorder characterized by mental retardation, brachycephaly, upslanting palpebral fissures, eye abnormalities, and highly arched palate. It was characterized in 1971; eight cases had been identified as of 1995.

Symptoms and signs
The signs and symptoms of Kaufman oculocerebrofacial syndrome are consistent with the following:
 High palate
 Microcephaly
 Constipation
 Intellectual disability
 Muscular hypotonia
 Nystagmus

Cause
The cause of this condition is apparently due to mutation in the UBE3B gene and is inherited via autosomal recessive manner. This gene is located at molecular location- base pairs 109,477,410 to 109,543,628 and position 24.11 on chromosome 12.

Genetics

The mechanism (or pathogenesis) of Kaufman oculocerebrofacial syndrome appears to begin due to a mutation in the E3 ubiquitin protein ligase. (UBE3B).

One finds that the normal mechanism of UBE3B gene is important in the ubiquitin-proteasome system. The aforementioned system helps to remove proteins that have degraded.

However, when not working properly due to the mutation in the UBE3B gene(at least 15 mutations) results in an unstable UBE3B protein which has a negative effect on the ubiquitin-proteasome system.

Diagnosis

The diagnosis of Kaufman oculocerebrofacial syndrome can be achieved via molecular testing approaches. Additionally to ascertain if the individual has the condition:
 Growth assessment
 Thyroid function evaluation
 Kidney ultrasound
 Echocardiogram

Differential diagnosis
Kaufman oculocerebrofacial syndrome differential diagnosis consists of:

Management
Treatment for this condition entails surveillance of growth and contractures. Furthermore, the following are treatment options:
 Thyroid hormone replacement
 Speech therapy
 Hearing aids

See also
 Ubiquitin

References

Further reading

External links 
 PubMed

Autosomal recessive disorders
Congenital disorders
Rare syndromes
Genetic disorders with OMIM but no gene
Syndromes with craniofacial abnormalities